Heliconius burneyi, the Burney's longwing, is a butterfly of the family Nymphalidae. It was described by Jacob Hübner in 1831. It is found in the Amazon basin. The habitat consists of tall forests.

The larvae are gregarious and mostly feed on Passiflora species from the subgenera Astrophea and Distephana. Full-grown larvae have a maroon and black body with a black head and reach a length of about 10 mm.

Subspecies

Heliconius burneyi burneyi (French Guiana)
Heliconius burneyi ada Neustetter, 1925 (Brazil: Rondônia)
Heliconius burneyi anjae Neukirchen, 1995 (Brazil: Amazonas)
Heliconius burneyi boliviensis Neukirchen, 1995 (Bolivia)
Heliconius burneyi catharinae Staudinger, 1885 (Brazil: Pará, Amazonas)
Heliconius burneyi huebneri Staudinger, 1897 (Peru)
Heliconius burneyi jamesi Neukirchen, 1995 (Peru)
Heliconius burneyi koenigi Neukirchen, 1995 (Peru)
Heliconius burneyi lindigii C. & R. Felder, 1865 (Colombia)
Heliconius burneyi mirtarosa Orellana, 2006 (Venezuela)
Heliconius burneyi skinneri Brown & Fernández, 1985 (Venezuela)

References

 Heliconius burneyi at Heliconius Butterflies

burneyi
Nymphalidae of South America
Lepidoptera of Brazil
Lepidoptera of Colombia
Lepidoptera of French Guiana
Lepidoptera of Venezuela
Fauna of the Amazon
Butterflies described in 1831